Albanian Orthodox Archbishopric of Tirana-Durrës is the principal (central) Eastern Orthodox eparchy (diocese) of the Albanian Orthodox Church. It is headquartered in Tirana, the capital city of Albania. Secondary title (Durrës) refers to the nearby coastal city, the most important historical center of Christianity in the region. The Archbishopric covers central and northern regions of modern Albania. Since 1992, it is headed by Archbishop Anastasios of Tirana-Durrës and All Albania.

History
Modern Archbishopric was created as a result of ecclesiastical reorganization, that was originally initiated within the Albanian movement for autocephaly. In 1912, creation of modern Albanian state was declared. At that time, central regions of the country belonged to the ancient Eparchy of Durrës, under the jurisdiction of the Patriarchate of Constantinople. In 1917, during the occupation of Albania in First World War, metropolitan Jacob had to leave Durrës for Constantinople, but did not resign his post, hoping to return. After the war, movement for Albanian autocephaly gained momentum, thus preventing metropolitan Jacob to return to Durrës. In the same time, transfer of diocesan see from Durrës to Tirana was proposed. Several provisional solutions were implemented during the period between 1918 and 1928, resulting in election of Visarion Xhuvani as archbishop of Tirana-Durrës (1929-1936). Since that time, Archbishopric of Tirana-Durrës remains the principal eparchy of the Albanian Orthodox Church.

See also
 Albanian Orthodox Church
 Eastern Orthodoxy in Albania
 Roman Catholic Archbishopric of Tirana-Durrës

References

Sources

External links
 Kryepiskopata e Shenjtë e Tiranës dhe e Durrësit
 Ιερά Αρχιεπισκοπή Τιράνων και Δυρραχίου

Albanian Orthodox Church
Religion in Tirana
Durrës